The Aheria are Indian caste found mainly in the states of Haryana, Rajasthan and Uttar Pradesh.

References

Social groups of India